Fyodorovka (Russian: Фёдоровка, Bashkir: Фёдоровка) is a village in Ufimsky District, Russia.

Population 
 National composition
According to the Russian Census of 2002, prevailing nationalities — are Tatars (37%) and Bashkirs (49%).

References 

Rural localities in Ufimsky District